Rakesh Mohan Bhatt is a professor of Linguistics at the University of Illinois at Urbana-Champaign. He received his MA in linguistics with a specialization in sociolinguistics from The University of Pittsburgh in 1987. He also received his PhD in linguistics with a specialization in syntax from the University of Illinois at Urbana-Champaign in 1994. He is the author of two published books: Verb Movement and the Syntax of Kashmiri and World Englishes: The Study of New Linguistic Varieties (co-authored with R. Mesthrie). His forthcoming book is titled Language in Diaspora, which is under contract with Cambridge University Press. He is famous for his works on Migration, Minorities, and Multilingualism,  Language Contact and Code-switching, and Language Ideology, Planning, Maintenance and Shift. His work on Code-switching and Optimal Grammar of Bilingual Language Use (Co-authored with Agnes Bolonyai) offers a new perspective on the study of motivations for code-switching.

References

External links
 Rakesh Bhatt's home page

Year of birth missing (living people)
Living people
Linguists from the United States
University of Illinois Urbana-Champaign faculty
University of Pittsburgh alumni
University of Illinois Urbana-Champaign alumni